Elections to Shetland Islands Council were held on 3 May 2012, the same day as the other Scottish local government elections. The election was the second using the seven new wards created as a result of the Local Governance (Scotland) Act 2004, each ward elected three or four Councillors using the single transferable vote system a form of proportional representation, with 22 Councillors elected.

As in 2007 Independents took all of the 22 seats on the Council. The Scottish National Party contested both Lerwick Wards for the first time in 2012 but only secured 1.9% of the vote. The Council was again administered solely by Independents.

Election results

Note: "Votes" are the first preference votes. The net gain/loss and percentage changes relate to the result of the previous Scottish local elections on 3 May 2007. This may differ from other published sources showing gain/loss relative to seats held at dissolution of Scotland's councils.

Ward results

North Isles
2007: 3xIndependent
2012: 3xIndependent
2007-2012 Change: No change

Shetland North
2007: 3xIndependent
2012: 3xIndependent
2007-2012 Change: No change

Shetland West
2007: 3xIndependent
2012: 3xIndependent
2007-2012 Change: No change

Shetland Central
2007: 3xIndependent
2012: 3xIndependent
2007-2012 Change: No change

Shetland South
2007: 3xIndependent
2012: 3xIndependent
2007-2012 Change: No change

Lerwick North
2007: 3xIndependent
2012: 3xIndependent
2007-2012: No change

Lerwick South
2007: 4xIndependent
2012: 4xIndependent
2007-2012: No change

Retiring Councillors

References

http://www.shetland.gov.uk/elections/default.asp

2012
2012 Scottish local elections
21st century in Shetland